Psalmody Abbey, also Psalmodie Abbey or Psalmodi Abbey ( or Psalmodie), was a Benedictine abbey located near Saint-Laurent-d'Aigouze in the Camargue, in the department of Gard and the region of Languedoc-Roussillon in the south of France. It was destroyed in 1703.

History
Psalmody Abbey was founded in the 5th century by monks from the Abbey of St. Victor, Marseille.

The new monastery acquired considerable importance and became directly accountable to Rome. Its influence grew throughout the region, mostly because of its trade in salt. It reached its peak in the 12th century, and its decline set in from the 15th. It was secularised in the 16th century by a bull of Pope Paul III and the buildings were largely destroyed during the war of the Camisards by Catinat, although its revenues continued to be drawn by commendatory abbots until the French Revolution.

Only a few scattered ruins survive. The site was declared a monument historique in 1984.

List of abbots

762-815 : Corbilien
815-840 : Théodemir
840-886 : Thibaud
886-909 : Witard I
909-9?? : Raimbaud
9??-997 : Bermond
997-1004 : Witard II
1004-1054 : Warnier
1054-1071 : Raymond I
1071-1076 : Guillaume I Philaud
1076-1082 : Bérenger
1082-1084 : Arnaud I
1084-1085 : Pierre I
1085-1086 : Guillaume II
1086-1097 : Arnaud II
1097-1115 : Foulques I
1115-1117 : Pierre II
1117-1141 : Bertrand
1141-1155 : Pierre III
1155-1174 : Guillaume III
1174-1180 : Pierre IV d’Uzès
1180-1185 : Guillaume IV
1185-1190 : Foulques II
1190-1198 : Guillaume V
1198-1203 : Aldebert
1203-1203 : Raymond II
1203-1220 : Bernard I de Génerac
1220-1226 : Raymond III
1226-1243 : Pons
1243-1248 : Guillaume VI
1248-1249 : Raymond IV
1249-1257 : Guillaume VII Catel
1257-1272 : Géraud de Bruguières
1272-1275 : Bernard II de Nages
1275-1316 : Pierre V
1316-1317 : Pierre VI Bedos
1317-1319 : Raymond V Bernard
1319-1320 : Arnaud III
1320-1330 : Frédol
1330-1332 : Gaillard
1332-1352 : Raymond VI de Sérignac
1352-1362 : Gaucelme de Déaux
1362-1364 : Raymond VII
1364-1368 : Guillaume VIII Columbi
1368-1401 : Pierre VII de Lascarri
1401-1415 : Aymeric des Gardies
1415-1438 : Arnaud IV de Saint-Félix  (1)
1438-1439 : Pierre VIII de Narbonne de Talairan
1439-1462 : Arnaud IV de Saint-Félix  (2)
1462-1484 : Guillaume IX de Saint-Félix
1484-1508 : Guy Lauret
1508-1511 : Jacques Fournier de Beaune-Semblançay
1511-1523 : Martin Fournier de Beaune-Semblançay
1523-1529 : Jérôme de Canosse
1529-1532 : Louis I de Canosse
1532-1536 : Renaud de Marigny
1536-1540 : Jean I de Luxembourg-Brienne
1540-1571 : Barnabé de Fayolles
1571-1590 : François I de Fayolles
1590-1606 : Jean II de Fayolles
1606-1618 : Marc de Calvière de Saint-Césaire
1618-1632 : Jean III de Calvière de Saint-Césaire
1632-1646 : François II de Calvière de Saint-Césaire
1646-1656 : Antoine de Calvière de Saint-Césaire
1656-1690 : Louis II de Calvière de Saint-Césaire
1690-1712 : François III Chevalier de Saulx
1713-1719 : Louis III François-Gabriel de Hénin-Liétard
1719-1744 : Charles de Bannes d’Avejan
1744-1755 : Louis IV François de Vivet de Montclus
1755-1776 : Jean-Louis du Buisson de Beauteville
1776-1784 : Pierre IX Marie-Madeleine Cortois de Barbe
1784-1791 : Cardinal Louis V François de Bausset-Roquefort

Source: Gallia Christiana

Notes and references

Sources and external links
 Clébert, Jean-Paul, 1972: Guide de la Provence mystérieuse. Paris: Éd. Tchou
 Nimausensis.com: history of Psalmody Abbey 

Benedictine monasteries in France
Buildings and structures in Gard
Christian monasteries established in the 5th century